Castagnetti is an Italian surname. Notable people with the surname include:

Alberto Castagnetti (1943–2009), Italian swimmer and coach
Michele Castagnetti (born 1989), Italian footballer
Pierluigi Castagnetti (born 1945), Italian politician

Italian-language surnames